Geoffrey Heywood Collier (born 25 July 1950) is an English former footballer who played as a forward in the Football League for Notts County.

Collier was born in Blackpool, and began his football career with Norcross and Blackpool Wren Rovers, with whom he won the 1970–71 West Lancashire League and Lancashire Amateur Shield. After two seasons in the Northern Premier League with Fleetwood and Macclesfield Town, with whom he won the Cheshire Senior Cup in 1973, Collier attracted attention from bigger clubs, and signed for Notts County of the Football League Second Division. He made his debut as a substitute in a 2–1 home win against Fulham, and appeared twice more, each time as a substitute, before returning to Macclesfield, where he was top scorer in both 1974–75 and 1975–76.

References

1950 births
Living people
Sportspeople from Blackpool
English footballers
Association football forwards
Blackpool Wren Rovers F.C. players
Fleetwood Town F.C. players
Macclesfield Town F.C. players
Notts County F.C. players
Northern Premier League players
English Football League players